Guhagar Assembly constituency is one of the 288 Vidhan Sabha (Legislative Assembly) constituencies of Maharashtra state in western India.

Overview
Guhagar constituency is one of the five Vidhan Sabha constituencies located in the Ratnagiri district.

Before the delimitation of the parliamentary constituencies in 2008, Guhagar was part of the Ratnagiri Lok Sabha constituency. After the delimitation, it became part of the Raigad Lok Sabha constituency along with five other Vidhan Sabha segments, namely Dapoli in the Ratnagiri district and Pen, Alibag, Shrivardhan and Mahad in the Raigad district.

Members of Legislative Assembly

Election results

General elections 2009

General elections 2014
 Jadhav Bhaskar Bhaurao (NCP): 72,525
 Vinay Shridhar Natu (BJP): 39,761
 Vijaykumar Bhosle (Shiv Sena): 32,083
 Sawant Sandip Shivram (Congress): 3,315

General elections 2019
 Jadhav Bhaskar Bhaurao (Shiv Sena): 78748
 Betkar Sahadev Devji (NCP): 52297
 Umesh Uday Pawar (BSP): 2009
 Ganesh Arun Kadam (MNS): 2524
 Jadhav Vikas Yashwant (Vanchit): 5069
 Nota: 2061

See also
 Guhagar
 List of constituencies of Maharashtra Vidhan Sabha

References

Assembly constituencies of Maharashtra
Ratnagiri district